Mylagaulus is an extinct genus of rodents in the family Mylagaulidae. Mylagaulus lived in the Americas during the middle to late Miocene. The genus contains the following species:
M. cambridgensis
M. cornusaulax Czaplewski, 2012 – Miocene, Oklahoma (United States)
M. elassos
M. kinseyi
M. sesquipedalis

References

Prehistoric rodent genera
Extinct mammals of North America